Yvette Kane (born October 11, 1953) is a senior United States district judge of the United States District Court for the Middle District of Pennsylvania.

Early life and education

Kane was born in Donaldsonville, Louisiana. After graduating high school at age 15, Kane received a Bachelor of Arts degree in Sociology from Nicholls State University in 1973 and a Juris Doctor from Tulane University Law School in 1976.

Legal career

Following law school graduation, Kane was a trial attorney at the United States Equal Employment Opportunity Commission from 1977 to 1978 and an Assistant State Attorney General in the Colorado Attorney General's Office from 1978 to 1980. Kane then served as deputy district attorney in Denver from 1980 to 1986.

After moving to Harrisburg, Pennsylvania, Kane became a deputy attorney general to the Pennsylvania Attorney General from 1986 to 1991. She was a chief counsel of the Independent Regulatory Review Commission from 1991 to 1992. She was a private practice lawyer in Harrisburg from 1993 to 1995. She then served as Secretary of the Commonwealth of Pennsylvania from 1995 to 1998, under former Governor Tom Ridge.

Federal judicial career

On June 4, 1998, President Bill Clinton nominated Kane to a seat on the United States District Court for the Middle District of Pennsylvania, which had been vacated by Edwin M. Kosik. She was confirmed by the United States Senate on October 21, 1998, and received her commission on October 22, 1998. Kane served as Chief Judge of the United States District Court for the Middle District of Pennsylvania from 2006 to 2013. She assumed senior status on October 11, 2018, her 65th birthday.

Sources

Website of Judge Yvette Kane

1953 births
Living people
Nicholls State University alumni
Tulane University Law School alumni
Secretaries of the Commonwealth of Pennsylvania
Judges of the United States District Court for the Middle District of Pennsylvania
United States district court judges appointed by Bill Clinton
People from Harrisburg, Pennsylvania
People from Donaldsonville, Louisiana
20th-century American judges
21st-century American judges
20th-century American women judges
21st-century American women judges